Sunol is an unincorporated community and census-designated place in Cheyenne County, Nebraska, United States. As of the 2010 census it had a population of 73.

Demographics

History
Sunol was platted in 1909. A post office was established at Sunol in 1910, and remained in operation until it was discontinued in 1973.

References

Census-designated places in Cheyenne County, Nebraska
Census-designated places in Nebraska